Fort White Wildlife and Environmental Area (WEA) protects 1,610 acres of primarily sandhill habitat four miles west of Fort White in Gilchrist County, Florida.

Fauna 

The imperiled Sherman's fox squirrel, gopher tortoise, Florida mouse, and gopher frog all live in the open sandhills of Fort White WEA. In addition, river otters, beavers, and even manatees may be seen in the adjacent Santa Fe River that flows along the eastern boundary. Birds are represented by numerous migratory and resident species including swallow-tailed kite, barred owl, and Bachman's sparrow.

Recreational activities 
Gray squirrel, wild turkey, and white-tailed deer hunting take place here during their respective seasons and bass fishing is popular along the Santa Fe River. Loop trails, both along the river and through the sandhills, permit access to much of the area. Paddlers can access the large bald cypress trees and wildlife-viewing opportunities on the Santa Fe River from a boat ramp located near the parking area on NE 2nd Way.

References 

Protected areas of Gilchrist County, Florida
Nature reserves in Florida
Wildlife management areas of Florida